The Moses Mould House is a Registered Historic Place located at the junction of NY 17K and Kaistertown Road in the Town of Montgomery, in Orange County, New York. It is just up Kaisertown from another site on the National Register, the Jacob Shafer House. Mould was the first of a large family of German settlers in the town to bear the name. The house was built in a Greek Revival style.

It was added to the National Register of Historic Places in 2002.

See also
National Register of Historic Places listings in Orange County, New York

References

Houses on the National Register of Historic Places in New York (state)
Houses in Orange County, New York
National Register of Historic Places in Orange County, New York
Greek Revival houses in New York (state)